Vampire Survivors is a roguelike shoot 'em up video game developed and published by Luca Galante, also known as poncle. Following an early access period from December 17, 2021, it was released for macOS and Windows on October 20, 2022. Ports to Xbox One and Xbox Series X/S were released on November 10, 2022, and for Android and iOS devices on December 8, 2022.

The player controls an automatically attacking character while fighting against continuous waves of monsters, with the goal being to survive the onslaught for as long as possible and unlock additional characters, weapons, and relics for subsequent sessions. In spite of the game's name and key art, none of the variety of monsters encountered are vampires.

Reception to the game has been positive, with it receiving accolades at the Golden Joystick Awards, New York Game Awards and D.I.C.E. Awards. It has five nominations at the upcoming British Academy Games Awards, including Best Game.

Gameplay 
The player selects one of multiple characters with different starting weapons and bonuses, and controls them on an endless stage with an auto-generated, repeating layout. The player's weapons attack automatically, and the goal is to survive as long as possible against constant waves of monsters that inflict damage when they come in contact with the player. Defeating monsters and exploring the stage allows the player to collect experience gems, which are used to level up, "floor chicken", which restores the player's health, and other helpful items. Each level increase provides the player the choice of three or four weapons and passive power-ups; once the player has collected six weapons and six power-ups and upgraded them all fully, any further levels they gain offer only gold coins or floor chicken. Another way to upgrade weapons and power-ups is to open chests, which are dropped by particularly powerful monsters and may contain one, three, or five random items. Most weapons have an ultimate form that can be attained by opening a chest after fully upgrading them and meeting other specific conditions.

Sessions of Vampire Survivors have a soft time limit of 15 or 30 minutes, depending on the stage chosen. At the time limit, the stage is cleared of all enemies and a final, tremendously strong enemy named Death will spawn. One additional Death will appear every consecutive minute thereafter to ensure the player's eventual demise. A session that reaches or exceeds the stage's time limit is considered a successful completion and rewards bonus gold coins. In between sessions, accumulated gold coins can be spent to unlock new characters and persistent power-ups. Additionally, by completing challenges, the player can also unlock new stages, weapons, and characters.

Plot 
Vampire Survivors is nominally set in rural Italy in 2021. Hordes of monsters summoned by the evil Bisconte Draculó ravage the land, and the Belpaese family and other heroic survivors take it upon themselves to hunt down and defeat Draculó. This quest takes them through monster-infested locales such as a cursed forest, a haunted library, an abandoned dairy plant, an ominous tower, and an otherworldly chapel.

Development 
Developer Luca "poncle" Galante began developing Vampire Survivors in 2020 while he was unemployed. He wanted to create Vampire Survivors because he wanted to manage a community, based on his past experience as being an admin for an Ultima Online server. The game was inspired by Magic Survival, a mobile game that also consisted of a character automatically attacking enemies. Development of the initial early access version took around a year, with Galante spending around £1100 on assets, art, and music. Prior to developing Vampire Survivors, Galante had been a developer in the gambling industry, and he used his knowledge of how to use flashy graphics for slot machines as part of the allure for Vampire Survivors chest-opening animations.

The success of the game exceeded Galante's expectations and allowed him to quit his job in February 2022 to focus completely on development of the game. He was informally assisted by "a few friends" in their spare time. Planned content included additional weapons, characters, and stages, and an "endless mode". Galante's intent was to bring Vampire Survivors out of early access by the end of 2022. Galante hired multiple freelancers in March 2022 to expand the Vampire Survivors team and accelerate development. In addition to outlining the scope of the promised new content with a roadmap, Galante explained that a major milestone slated for mid-2022 would be porting Vampire Survivors to an "industry-standard" game engine to improve its overall performance.

The full game was released for macOS and Windows on October 20, 2022. The game was also ported to Xbox One and Xbox Series X/S on November 10, 2022. Ports for Android and iOS devices were released in December 8, 2022. The mobile versions were fast-tracked for development as a response to a number of clones that appeared on mobile app stores with stolen code and assets from the original game. While the game released on other platforms as an inexpensive but premium game, the mobile versions are free-to-play with optional ads.

Downloadable content
The first paid DLC for the game, titled Legacy of the Moonspell, was announced on December 6, 2022. Inspired by Japanese folklore and anime, it adds thirteen weapons, eight characters, and a new stage featuring enemies designed after yōkai and oni. The expansion released on December 15, 2022 for macOS, Windows, and Xbox platforms.

Reception 

While Vampire Survivors was initially obscure on release, by late January 2022 it became a hit and reached over 30,000 concurrent players on Steam. This number continued to climb, with the game reaching over 70,000 concurrent players the following month. While not the first game in its genre, Vampire Survivors led to several other games based on automatic gameplay and roguelike progression being released the following year, most released for a small price and in early access.

Vampire Survivors received "generally favorable" reviews for Windows according to review aggregator Metacritic; the Xbox Series X/S version received "universal acclaim".

Ian Walker of Kotaku and Graham Smith of Rock Paper Shotgun praised the game, both comparing the game to dopamine. Polygon's Nicole Carpenter noted the game's depth, with her saying "no one streamer I've watched played entirely the same". Aaron Zimmerman of Ars Technica named Vampire Survivors as his pick for game of the year. Marie Dealessandri of GamesIndustry.biz also named Vampire Survivors her game of the year, speaking to how well it played on the handheld Steam Deck, which had also released in 2022.

Accolades

Notes

References 

2022 video games
Android (operating system) games
Dark fantasy video games
D.I.C.E. Award for Action Game of the Year winners
Early access video games
Golden Joystick Award winners
IOS games
Indie video games
MacOS games
New York Game Award winners
Retro-style video games
Roguelike video games
Shoot 'em ups
Single-player video games
Video games developed in the United Kingdom
Video games set in Italy
Windows games
Xbox Cloud Gaming games
Xbox One games
Xbox Series X and Series S games